Richard Hawken (born 3 January 1972) is a British racing driver who competed in the British Touring Car Championship. He made his debut in 2015.

Racing career
Hawken began his career in karts at the age of 12 claiming the South of England Open championship at 14. He progressed into cars in 1991 aged 19 winning his first ever race in a Renault. In 2002 he purchased an RML built Vauxhall Cavalier entering the BARC Formula Saloons series. In 2004 he purchased an RML built Nissan Primera chassis #33 and continued to race in the BRSCC Euro Saloon & Sports Car Championship where he went on to win 3 Championships including the Super Touring Class. In October 2014, it was announced that Hawken would make his British Touring Car Championship debut as a manufacturer driver with Infiniti Support Our Paras Racing driving an Infiniti Q50. However, after Infiniti withdrew their manufacturer support from the team amidst a change in top management Dr. Andrew Palmer in mid 2015, he was replaced by Martin Donnelly.

In 2018 Hawken made his debut in the Porsche Carrera Cup GB driving with his lucky #84 on the car visiting the podium twice at Brands Hatch Indy and Brands Hatch GP circuits. He finished the AM Championship 4th.

Hawken returned to the Porsche Carrera Cup GB in 2019 but didn't finish the season due to his Sponsorship having money issues.

Racing record

Complete British Touring Car Championship results
(key) (Races in bold indicate pole position – 1 point awarded just in first race; races in italics indicate fastest lap – 1 point awarded all races; * signifies that driver led race for at least one lap – 1 point given all races)

References

http://www.btcccrazy.co.uk/btcc/richard-hawken-over-the-moon-to-finally-hit-the-track-with-infiniti/

External links
 
http://www.futuresmag.com/2018/03/16/classic-cars-make-great-investment-vehicles
https://billionairechronicle.com/billionaire-chronicle-special-lifestlye-feature-richard-hawken/
https://www.theceomagazine.com/business/management-leadership/uncovering-powerful-leadership-traits-at-anthony-ritossas-7th-global-family-office-investment-summit/
https://www.youtube.com/watch?v=swI142WnjTk
https://www.youtube.com/watch?v=b4OiM7vNiEo

1972 births
Living people
British Touring Car Championship drivers
English racing drivers
British racing drivers
Porsche Carrera Cup GB drivers